Lee Young-jun may refer to:
 Lee Young-jun (ice hockey)
 Lee Young-jun (footballer)